Robert Churchwell (born February 20, 1972 in South Bend, Indiana) is a retired American basketball player. He played collegiately for the Georgetown University.

A 6'6" (1.98 cm) 195 lb (89 kg) guard/forward, he played 4 games for the National Basketball Association's Golden State Warriors in the 1995–96 season.

On June 14, 1994 Chris Devine of the Chicago-based company Major Broadcasting purchased the Wichita Falls Texans, a Continental Basketball Association (CBA) team in Wichita Falls, Texas. The team was moved to Chicago and renamed the "Rockers". During the 1994 CBA draft the Rockers had the eighth pick out of 16 teams. The Rockers selected Derrick Phelps from the University of North Carolina, Deon Thomas from the University of Illinois, Robert Churchwell from Georgetown University, Shon Tarver from the University of California–Los Angeles, and Kenny Williams from the University of Illinois–Chicago, respectively.[7] 
The Rockers made the 1995 CBA playoffs with a 28–28 record. During the first round, Chicago defeated the Quad City Thunder in a five-game series.[18] Chicago faced the Pittsburgh Piranhas in the American Conference Finals. Pittsburgh swept Chicago three games to zero in a best-of five series.
On March 12, 1996 the Chicago Rockers announced they were moving to La Crosse, Wisconsin after the 1995–96 season. The team reached an agreement to play at the La Crosse Center, paying one year's rent in advance. They would later become known as the La Crosse Bobcats.

He is currently a Disciplinary Director at Gonzaga College High School.

References 
 

1972 births
Living people
Basketball players from South Bend, Indiana
Chicago Rockers players
Florida Beachdogs players
Georgetown Hoyas men's basketball players
Golden State Warriors players
Gonzaga College High School alumni
La Crosse Bobcats players
SeaHorses Mikawa players
Shooting guards
Small forwards
Undrafted National Basketball Association players
American men's basketball players